Oi! Młodzież (Polish for "Oi! Youth") is the debut album of Polish street punk band The Analogs. Released only as an audio cassette, as the Rock'n'roller label did not release CDs then. The album had been re-released as a split CD under the title Oi! Młodzież/Mechaniczna Pomarańcza, including a debut album from another Polish punk rock band, Ramzes & The Hooligans.

Track listing
Titles in brackets are translated from Polish.

Side A
 "Nasze Ciała" (Our Bodies)
 "Oi! Młodzież" (Oi! Youth)
 "Popatrz Na... Cena za życie" (Look at... A Price for Life)
 "Szczecin"
 "Te Chłopaki" (Those Boys)
 "Ulica" (Street)

Side B
 "He He He" (Get a rope - Cock Sparrer cover)
 "Tygrys" (The Tiger)
 "Analogs Rules"
 "Jednoczcie się i zwyciężajcie" (Unite and Win)
 "Strzelby z Brixton" (Guns of Brixton - The Clash cover)
 "Dzieciaki atakujące policję" (Kids attacking cops)
 "Cud" (A Miracle)

Personnel
Dominik Pyrzyna - vocals
Marek Adamowicz - guitar
Ziemowit Pawluk - drums
Paweł Czekała - bass guitar

External links
  The Analogs official website
  Jimmy Jazz Records

1996 debut albums
The Analogs albums
Rock'n'roller albums